Leah Danielle Galton (born 24 May 1994) is an English footballer who currently plays as a forward for Women's Super League club Manchester United.

She has previously played for Sky Blue FC in the NWSL, Bayern Munich in Germany, and has represented England from under-15 to under-23 level.

Club career

Youth career
Galton started as a junior at Knaresborough Celtic before a spell at Harrogate Railway. She impressed local Leeds United coaches who recruited her for the academy where she rose through the youth ranks to the senior team. She scored her first senior goal for the team on 12 September 2010, aged 16, in a 4–1 Premier League Cup group stage win against Newcastle United Ladies. In 2012, she won the Ian Taylor Memorial Trophy, awarded to the most deserving young footballer playing within the Harrogate and District FA.

Hofstra Pride
In 2012, she earned a four-year scholarship to play collegiality for Hofstra Pride in America. Her 48 goals is the second-highest total in the program's history, her 26 assists tie her for first in total assists and her 122 career points are a program record. She is also the only three-time winner of the Colonial Athletic Association player of the year award and was a MAC Hermann Trophy semifinalist in her senior year.

Sky Blue FC
In January 2016, Galton was drafted by Sky Blue FC in the second round of the 2016 NWSL College Draft. However, per visa requirements, Galton was unable to join the team until after graduation. On 19 May 2016, she was added to roster. She scored her first goal for the club during her second appearance, an equaliser that helped Sky Blue to a 1–1 draw against the Chicago Red Stars.

Bayern Munich
On 22 December 2017, she signed with German club Bayern Munich in the Frauen-Bundesliga. She made her league debut in a 2–1 win against SGS Essen on 18 February 2018. In March, she stated that she would be taking a break from playing professionally.

Manchester United
On 13 July 2018, it was announced that Galton was joining Manchester United for their inaugural season. She made her competitive debut for Manchester United, as a 59th minute substitute for Kirsty Hanson, in a 1–0 League Cup victory against Liverpool on 19 August and her Championship debut in a 12–0 win against Aston Villa on 9 September. On 13 December, she scored her first goal for the club in a 3–0 win over Everton in the FA WSL Cup. She scored her first league goal in a 5–1 win over fellow title challengers Tottenham Hotspur on 31 March 2019.

On 27 January 2020, Galton signed a new contract with United until the end of the 2020–21 season, with an option for a further year. She was voted FA WSL Player of the Month for December 2020 after scoring in all three of United's games including a brace against Bristol City. On 5 February 2021, Galton signed a new three-and-a-half year contract with Manchester United until 2024 with the option for an additional year.

International career
Galton has been capped internationally for England at under-15, under-17 and under-19 level, and was part of the squad for the 2011 UEFA Women's Under-17 Championship.

She was a key player for the U23s at the 2016 La Manga Tournament which led to her being called up to train with the senior England national team for the first time in August 2016, but had to pull out due to a hip injury.

Personal life
Galton is an ambassador with Sports Recruiting USA alongside Jade Pennock, a Leeds-based company that sends youngsters to America on scholarships.

In May 2019, Galton shared photos on social media following her engagement to partner Sheridan Douglas.

Career statistics

Club
.

Honours
Manchester United
 FA Women's Championship: 2018–19
Individual
FA WSL Player of the Month: December 2020, January 2022, December 2022

References

External links
 Profile at the Manchester United F.C. website
 Profile at the Sky Blue FC website
 Profile at the Hofstra Pride website
 

1994 births
Living people
English women's footballers
Sportspeople from Harrogate
Hofstra Pride women's soccer players
NJ/NY Gotham FC players
National Women's Soccer League players
Expatriate women's soccer players in the United States
England women's under-23 international footballers
Leeds United Women F.C. players
FA Women's National League players
English expatriate sportspeople in the United States
NJ/NY Gotham FC draft picks
FC Bayern Munich (women) players
Manchester United W.F.C. players
Women's Super League players
English expatriate sportspeople in Germany
Expatriate women's footballers in Germany
Frauen-Bundesliga players
Women's association football forwards